Kah is an Apache game described by Geronimo in his 1906 autobiography as told to S. M. Barrett. The game was always played at night, after a feast and dancing were held to celebrate some notable event. It usually involved gambling and was the most popular gambling game among the Apaches.

Playing the game
Kah (literally translated as "foot") involved two sides, one at first representing the feathered tribe, or birds, of the Apache creation story; the other representing the beasts. Each side might be one player or a team of any number.

The teams are separated by a campfire. On each side a row of four holes are dug about four feet (1.2 m) apart, and in each hole is placed a moccasin.  The side representing the feathered tribe hangs blankets between the fire and them so that the team representing the beasts cannot see what they are doing, and then they begin to sing. They then place a bone in one of the four moccasins.  The bone represents the sacred round white stone that the eagle dropped on the head of a monster, killing it and thereby benefiting mankind, in the creation story.  

Once the bone has been hidden, the singing continues but the blankets are torn down, and a designated player of the beasts' side immediately runs up to and strikes one of the moccasins with a war club, having a one in four chance of finding the bone.  If successful, the team of the beasts gets possession of the bone and have their turn representing the feathered tribe, singing and hiding the bone on their side of the campfire.  Otherwise the hiding team keeps possession of the bone for the next round.

Scoring is kept by using a bundle of sticks.  For each point scored, that team takes one stick.  The game is over when no sticks are left, the side having the most sticks being declared the winner. Each game usually takes about four or five hours to play.

Variation
The Arizona Historical Society's web site says that the team representing the beasts does the singing while the birds' team hides the bone in one of the moccasins. If the singing team finds the bone they get a point but they do not get the bone. Rather, they get to sing and search again.  That contradicts Geronimo's description, however.

References

Apache culture
Native American sports and games
Gambling games